Savannah Sanitoa (born April 30, 1987) is a track and field athlete who competes internationally for American Samoa. She is most famous for competing at the 100 metres sprint at the 2009 IAAF World Championships in Berlin.

In 2006, Sanitoa represented American Samoa at the 11th IAAF World Junior Championships in Beijing. She competed at the 100 metres sprint and placed 8th in her heat without advancing to the second round. She ran the distance in a time of 14.56 seconds.

In 2009, she took part in the 12th IAAF World Championships. She competed at the 100 metres sprint and placed 6th in her heat without advancing to the second round. She ran the distance in a time of 14.23 seconds, 0.16 seconds outside of her personal best of 14.07.

Personal bests

Achievements

References

1987 births
Living people
American Samoan female sprinters
American Samoan female shot putters
American people of Samoan descent
World Athletics Championships athletes for American Samoa
21st-century American women